Ahmed Sayed Amin (born in 1980) is an Egyptian comedian, actor, and writer. He graduated from the Faculty of Fine Arts, Helwan University in 2002. Amin came to prominence from his online video "30 sanya" (30 seconds) that went viral among Egyptians on Facebook. His second, and more important step, was the Al Plateau TV show. 2019, came up with his successful TV show Amin and partners. In November 2019, it was officially declared by Netflix that Amin is to star their upcoming first-ever Egyptian original Paranormal, in the role of Refaat Ismael.

Early life

Born in Kuwait to an Egyptian middle-class working family and raised in Cairo, Amin practiced Acting as an amateur from an early age but he began his office career in the field of children literature as an editor-in-chief for Bassem magazine the Saudi kids magazine, afterward, he wrote Cartoons for big Egyptian media-channels, that was like "Bassant w diasty" "El kobtan Azuz" and more, but after 10 years of office work he decided to leave everything and get back to his comfort zone, acting.

Career

Amin's first gig was "30 Sanya". The low-production content was filmed by himself inside his house and posted on his facebook and YouTube accounts. It was the kick-start to his second move, hosting "Al Plateau" TV show; which was one of the popular local Comedy shows, and currently has 131,330,187 views. In Ramadan 2017, Amin made his first appearance as an actor as "Semsem" in "Al Wassiya". The character had a good impact that a crowd-sourced gallery was arranged around Semsesm's style and props. 2019 comes Amin's digital show "Al Familia" discussing family issues like technology effect on family bonds, 2019 also witnessed the launching of his TV show "Amin and partners" with first season consisted of 14 theatrical live shows that were presented on TV too, Season 2 comes in 2020 as a sketch-based TV show.  

Amin played the lead role of Netflix’s first-ever Egyptian original "Paranormal" directed by Amr Salama as an adaptation of late Egyptian author Ahmed Khaled Tawfiq’s popular horror\thriller book series,Ma Waraa Al Tabiaa" Paranormal", which sold over 15 million copies worldwide from Egyptian pocket novels,making it one of the most commercially successful literary works to ever come out of the Middle East and North Africa.

Upcoming work

Social responsibility

Amin made several appearances in campaigns that support charity organizations, including Baheya Foundation for Early Detection and Treatment of Breast cancer.

He is the face of many campaigns by the Egyptian ministry of health in cooperation with the World Health Organization and UNICEF under the main campaign of "100 million healthy lives".

Amin shows a deep interest in the cause of Education, as he organized a tour in different universities to talk with new generations.

Works and awards

 ArabSat Festival Award for Best Comedy Show (2016)
 Arab Producers Union Award for Best Comedy Show (2017)
 Cairo Artwork and Media Mondial For Best Comedy Show (2017)
 Dear Guest 15 th for Best Actor second role award (2018)
 International Hamsa Festival Of Literature And The Arts for best actor on his role in “Jazeret Ghamam” series (2022)
 ADCA Arab Dramas Critics Awards for  Best Actor Award for a Second Role (2022) 
 NRJ Radio for best actor public vote award (2022)

References 

1980 births
Living people
Egyptian comedians
21st-century Egyptian male actors
Egyptian writers
People from Kuwait City
Mass media people from Cairo
Helwan University alumni